Brad Domenico Benavides Agredo (born 20 July 2001) is a racing driver currently competing in the 2023 FIA Formula 2 Championship with PHM Racing by Charouz.

Career

Karting 
Benavides started his karting career in 2017, when he finished ninth in the WSK Final Cup in the KZ2-class. He then finished fourth in the WSK Champions Cup in 2018 and won the IAME Winter Cup the following year in the X30 Shifter class. Two years later he came 11th in the KZ category of the Spanish Karting Championship with two wins, having missed the final two rounds due to his racing commitments.

Lower formulae 
The American driver made his single-seater debut in the final round of the 2018 Euroformula Open Championship for Campos Racing. He finished 9th in the first race, however he didn't score any points as he was classed as a guest driver.

Formula Renault Eurocup 
In 2019 Benavides raced for FA Racing in the Formula Renault Eurocup. He scored no points, and with a best race result of 13th he finished 23rd in the standings.

Formula Regional European Championship 
After a one-year hiatus Benavides made his return to racing in the Formula Regional European Championship with DR Formula RP Motorsport. In the first round of the season at Imola the American retired from the first race, but finished 14th in race two.

FIA Formula 3 Championship 
During the 2021 post-season testing, Benavides tested with Carlin. The following year, it was announced that Benavides would be included in their Formula 3 line-up for the 2022 season. Benavides had a disappointing season, but he scored his first points finish in the seventh round at Spa-Francorchamps in the sprint race, where he finished 8th. He ended the season 23rd in the standings with 3 points, ahead of teammate Enzo Trulli but far from other teammate and Williams Driver Academy member Zak O'Sullivan.

Benavides contested with ART Grand Prix during the final day of post-season testing during September.

FIA Formula 2 Championship 
In November 2022, the American would compete in the Formula 2 post-season test for Charouz Racing System, partnering Roy Nissany at the Yas Marina Circuit. Shortly after, Benavides was confirmed to drive for the outfit in 2023 alongside Roy Nissany under the new name PHM Racing by Charouz. To prepare for his new season, Benavides will compete the full season with MP Motorsport in the 2023 Formula Regional Middle East Championship.

Karting record

Karting career summary 

† As Benavides was a guest driver, he was ineligible to score points.

Racing record

Racing career summary 

† As Benavides was a guest driver, he was ineligible to score points.
* Season still in progress.

Complete Euroformula Open Championship results 
(key) (Races in bold indicate pole position; races in italics indicate points for the fastest lap of top ten finishers)

Complete Formula Renault Eurocup results
(key) (Races in bold indicate pole position) (Races in italics indicate fastest lap)

Complete Formula Regional European Championship results 
(key) (Races in bold indicate pole position) (Races in italics indicate fastest lap)

Complete FIA Formula 3 Championship results 
(key) (Races in bold indicate pole position; races in italics indicate points for the fastest lap of top ten finishers)

Complete Formula Regional Middle East Championship results
(key) (Races in bold indicate pole position) (Races in italics indicate fastest lap)

* Season still in progress.

Complete FIA Formula 2 Championship results 
(key) (Races in bold indicate pole position) (Races in italics indicate points for the fastest lap of top ten finishers)

References

External links 
 
 

2001 births
Living people
American racing drivers
Euroformula Open Championship drivers
Formula Renault Eurocup drivers
Formula Regional European Championship drivers
Carlin racing drivers
FIA Formula 3 Championship drivers
FA Racing drivers
Campos Racing drivers
Drivex drivers
RP Motorsport drivers
Spanish racing drivers
FIA Formula 2 Championship drivers
Charouz Racing System drivers
MP Motorsport drivers
PHM Racing drivers
Formula Regional Middle East Championship drivers